The Electronic Tax Administration Advisory Committee (ETAAC) is a panel of the United States Department of the Treasury authorized under the Federal Advisory Committee Act. ETAAC panel members serve as volunteers that are appointed by the Secretary of Treasury and serve a three-year term.  ETAAC's primary purpose is to provide continued input into the development and implementation of the Internal Revenue Service’s strategy for electronic tax administration. ETAAC researches, analyzes, considers and makes recommendations on a wide range of electronic tax administration issues. Each June, ETAAC presents an annual report to the United States Congress on the IRS’s progress with electronic tax administration.
ETAAC also provides an organized public forum for the discussion of electronic tax administration issues in support of the overriding goal that electronic filing should be the preferred and most convenient method of filing tax and information returns to the IRS.

Mission and Composition
ETAAC helps convey to the IRS the public’s perception of the IRS's electronic tax administrative activities, offers constructive observations about current or proposed policies, programs and procedures, and suggests improvements. The ETAAC researches, analyzes, considers, and makes recommendations on a wide range of electronic tax administrative issues and provides input into the development of a strategic plan for electronic tax administration. ETAAC discussions focus on solutions to problems, as well as, constructive observations of electronic tax administrative issues. ETAAC's public forums provide an opportunity for industry and academic leaders to offer collective advice on electronic tax administration issues facing the IRS.

Current members

See also
IRS e-file
Electronic tax records

References

 IRS.gov — Electronic Tax Administration Advisory Committee (ETAAC) 
 Annual Reports to Congress 
 IRS.gov — Applications 
 Current Members 

United States Department of the Treasury
Tax administration